Chris Buck (born July 29, 1964) is a New York-based photographer known for his unconventional portraits.

Early life and career 
Buck grew up in the Toronto suburb of Etobicoke where his father, George Buck worked for Kodak Canada, giving him an early connection to photography. He attended Ryerson University where he majored in Photographic Arts. During this time he was a photo editor for Nerve, a Toronto monthly music paper, released 3 compilation cassettes of original music with Canadian and American bands with Materials + Processes, and briefly managed experimental rock group Violence & The Sacred.
Buck studied at Ryerson under noted street photographer Dave Heath and media critic Murray Pomerance, both of whom continued as mentors in the years after his graduation. He moved to New York in 1990 and has since shot many important magazine and advertising photographs.

Photographs and work 

Buck's move to New York in 1990 focused on magazine portrait work, and began a slow progression in the prominence of his celebrity sitters and the stature of his clients. His photography is currently most associated with GQ, Esquire, ESPN, and The Guardian Weekend Magazine.

Since the late 1990s Buck has photographed a number of commercial campaigns, for Diesel, Xerox, Microsoft, Mazda, Old Spice, Citibank, and IBM.

His most recognized portraits include those of Steve Martin, Andy Samberg, Chris Farley, Chloe Sevigny, and Nick Offerman. Buck has also photographed many American politicians, including Presidents Barack Obama, George H. W. Bush, George W. Bush and Donald Trump.  Buck has also directed several videos for clients such as GQ, Wired, SAP SE, Oscar Mayer, and Viagra.

In the spring and summer of 2015 Buck chronicled the adventures and eventual demise of a 3D figurine of himself. The series, called Likeness, included 141 photos and videos released daily on his Instagram account. 56 of the images were included in a limited edition artist book of the series.

Notable and newsworthy 

In the spring of 2010, photos he took for a Diesel ad campaign that encouraged consumers to "Be Stupid" led to some public outcry and heated editorials. Some ads were banned in the UK. The campaign won the Grand Prix for outdoor at the Cannes Lions International Festival of Creativity.

In August 2011 Buck became the center of a controversy when his Newsweek cover photo of presidential candidate Michele Bachmann caused a media stir. The photo even spawned a hate page titled "Meet Chris Buck, the a-hole who took the Michele Bachmann Newsweek photo."  The image prompted a comment from Sarah Palin and spawned several internet memes.

After Donald Trump's presidential win a 2006 portrait resurfaced with articles in Vice, The Guardian, and Time, having Buck refer to Trump as "damaged" in one and "a broken man" in another, although he added, "It may well be more a reflection of my state of mind, not his."

The May 2017 O, The Oprah Magazine focused on race in America, featuring Chris Buck's pictures depicting a flip of societal roles. The response was mostly positive with a minority accusing Buck and the publication of reverse racism. The viral photos led to interviews with Buck in the Huffington Post, CNN, and Mic.com.

Books 

In 2012 Buck's first monograph, Presence: The Invisible Portrait was released by German publisher Kehrer Verlag. Presence features 50 portraits in which the celebrity subjects are fully hiding, and therefore are not visible in the photographs. The book garnered press coverage worldwide, as well as receiving some awards.

In early 2017 Buck published Uneasy: Chris Buck Portraits 1986-2016, a monograph of his celebrity pictures, with 338 portraits and 129 stories behind the pictures. There is also an introduction by Sheila Heti. Press attention included GQ, People, CBC and New York magazine.

In 2021, Buck published Gentlemen's Club: Partners of Exotic Dancers, a collection of forty photo sittings and interviews exploring the relationships of these workers. The book received press coverage from The New Yorker, The New York Times and Refinery29.

Awards and exhibitions 

His awards include the Arnold Newman Prize for his portraiture, PDN's Notable Books 2012 and German Book Award 2013 Selected Title for his book Presence, and Luerzer's Archive 200 Best Ad Photographers (2012/2013 and 2014/2015). His work has appeared in: American Photography (40 times), Photo District News Photo Annual (22 times), and the Communication Arts Photography Annual (13 times).

His solo shows include:
 2022 Past Present Future, Rochester Institute of Technology, Rochester, NY
 2018 Magnificent Hurt, Florida Museum of Photographic Arts, Tampa, FL
 2017 Uneasy: Cover to Cover, PictureHouse, New York, NY
 2017 Uneasy, Krause Gallery, New York, NY
 2014 Turn of the Century Portraiture, Galerie Youn, Montreal, QC
 2013 Presence: The Invisible Portrait, Foley Gallery, New York, NY
 2002 The Sound of Music: New portraits of contemporary musicians, Other Music, New York, NY
 1998 FanClub, Saba Gallery, New York, NY

References

External links 
 Chris Buck's Professional Website
 Chris Buck live interview with Chase Jarvis
CBC Radio interview on Uneasy

1964 births
Living people
Place of birth missing (living people)
Toronto Metropolitan University alumni
20th-century Canadian photographers
21st-century Canadian photographers
Conceptual photographers
Canadian portrait photographers
American portrait photographers
Photographers from New York City
Artists from Toronto